Un amore is a 1965 Italian romance film directed by Gianni Vernuccio. It is based on the novel A Love Affair by Dino Buzzati.

Cast
Rossano Brazzi as Antonio Dorigo
Agnès Spaak as Laide
Gérard Blain as Marcello
Marisa Merlini as Ermelina
Lucilla Morlacchi as Luisa
Alice Field
Cesare Barilli
Lia Reiner
Stella Monclar
Lina Pozzi
Wilma Casagrande
Febo Villani
Anna María Aveta

References

External links

1965 films
Films based on works by Dino Buzzati
1960s Italian-language films
1960s romance films
Films directed by Gianni Vernuccio
Italian romance films
1960s Italian films